Xploderz is a line of toy weapons made by The Maya Group to compete with Hasbro's Nerf Super Soaker line and marketed as a safer alternative to paintball.  The concept is based on Orbeez, a girls' toy line also by The Maya Group that uses water-absorbent gel pellets, and hence is sometimes referred to as "Orbeez ball shooters".

When playing, a piston rod is manually pulled back against spring tension in a fashion similar to drawing a slingshot, allowing pellets to be drop-loaded from a top mounted magazine.  When the rod is released, the spring elasticity drives piston to pressurize the air pump behind the pellets, which in turn propels the pellets flying out forward.  

The ammunition used is what the Maya Group calls "H2Grow Technology", wherein superabsorbent polymer pellets (containing sodium polyacrylate, sodium hydroxide and colorings) grow into spherical hydrogel beads around 7 ~ 11 mm in size after being immersed in water for about three hours.  Unlike airsoft and paintball pellets, the hydrogel shots are quickly biodegradable, easy to clean off clothing, and will not cause any bodily injury due to their softness and readily tendency to fragment upon impact.

See also
 Gel ball shooter

References

External links
 Official site
 

Water guns
2010s toys
Products introduced in 2011